Emanon is a small, selective, Tulsa, Oklahoma based record label. The label was founded in 1999 by Mike Busch and Trevor Lane in Lane's Sapulpa Oklahoma studio.

Producers, Mixers and Studios

Emanon uses renowned producers and mixers such as Al Schmitt, Nile Rodgers, Steve Ripley, Jay Baumgardner4, Kevin Churko5, Mitch Allan, and David Teegarden (musician). Emanon also uses recognized studios such as Abbey Road Studios, Capitol Studios, Tree Sound Studios, Sunset Sound Studios, NRG Recording Studios, The Church Studio9

Artists
Artists who have recorded on the label include John Corabi,  Jenna Drey, JParis, Leanne Harte, Jura, Cardinal Trait, Fanzine, Lorenzo, and Brandon Cooper.10

Emanon and the RIAA and Music Downloading

Emanon is not a member of RIAA. Emanon believes the Internet is to today's youth what the radio was to the generation before. Emanon sells MP3 music files from its artists thru Independent Online Distribution Alliance.  They also distribute their product through Independent Online's on the iTunes Store. Emanon also has the latest songs by JParis available for free download on the artists website, without any digital rights management. Hence, unlike files purchased from iTunes or Napster, these files allow consumers the freedom to copy the songs they download to other devices of theirs.

Notable Accomplishments
 Fanzine's Roundabout is the fastest selling CD ever in Texas and Oklahoma in 2005.
 Jenna Drey's Just Like That, Reverse the Curse is adopted by the Boston Red Soxs in their World Series Winning 2004 season as the Soxs crowd exciter.11
 JParis' Here We Go Again reaches #1 on Clear Channel Radio Stations in 2005.
 Lorenzo's Love Shaped Bruise is voted Rock Album of the Year at The Independent Music Awards in 2006.12

External links
 https://web.archive.org/web/20070607191209/http://www.emanonrecords.com/ Official Site
 http://www.myspace.com/emanonrecords Myspace Site

Notes and Sources
 http://www.nrgrecording.com
 www.emanonrecords.com
 http://www.greatamericansong.com/fame-jennadrey.html
 http://www.independentmusicawards.com

American record labels